Drepanosticta fraseri (Fraser's shadowdamsel) is a species of damselfly in the family Platystictidae. It is endemic to Sri Lanka. it is sometimes known as a synonym of Drepanosticta submontana.

References

 Biodiversity of Sri Lanka
 Animal diversity web
 List of odonates of Sri Lanka

Damselflies of Sri Lanka
Insects described in 1955